Hynčina is a municipality and village in Šumperk District in the Olomouc Region of the Czech Republic. It has about 200 inhabitants.

Administrative parts
Villages of Dlouhá Ves and Křižanov are administrative parts of Hynčina.

References

Villages in Šumperk District